Agressor is a French death metal band which started in 1986.

Members

Current 
 Alexandre Colin-Tocquaine – guitar, chant (1986–present)
 Joël Guigou – bass (1991–present)
 Kevin Paradis – drums (2014–present)
 Michel Dumas – guitar (2016–present)

Past 
 Romain Goulon – drums - (2003-2008)
 Thierry Pinck – drums - (1988-1991)
 Jean Luc Falsini – drums - (1986-1988)
 Stéphane Guégan – drums - (1991-1994)
 Laurent Luret – bass - (1988-1991)
 J.M.Libeer – bass - (1986-1988)
 Patrick Gibelin – guitar (1990-1992)
 Manu Ragot – guitar - (1994)
 Josselin Sarroche (Belef) – guitar - (2000-2007)
 Pierre Schaffner – drums - (2000-2003) 
 Pierrick Valence – guitar - (2007-2014)
 Samuel Santiago - drums - (2014-2015)
 Noël Laguniak – drums - (1996)
 Kevin Verlay – guitar - (2014–2016)
 Cesar Vesvre - drums - (session 2017)
 Julien Helwin - drums - (session 2015)
 Sylvestre Alexandre - guitar - (session 2016)
 Kai Hahto - drums - (1999)
 Morten Nielsen - drums - (1999)

Discography 
  The Merciless Onslaught (demo) (1986)
  Licensed to Thrash (split LP with Loudblast) (1987)
  Satan's Sodomy (demo) (1987)
  Orbital Distortion (demo) (1989)
  Neverending Destiny (1990)
  Towards Beyond (1992)
  Satan's Sodomy (MCD ; réédition to Licensed to Thrash) (1993)
  Symposium of Rebirth (1994)
  Medieval Rites (2000)
  The Spirit of Evil (MCD + vidéos) (2001)
  The Merciless Onslaught (compilation demos) (2004)
  Deathreat (2006)

Notes and references

External links 
 

French death metal musical groups
French thrash metal musical groups
Noise Records artists
Season of Mist artists
Black Mark Production artists